Domestic Blues was the first solo album from Northern Ireland–based singer-songwriter, Bap Kennedy, and was released in 1998. The album was generally well-received, with allmusic calling it "an exceptionally intelligent recording" and Uncut saying that "[Domestic Blues is] a fine collection of songs" and reached number 8 in the billboard Americana chart

Recording
The album was recorded in Nashville, TN. Kennedy had received a phone call from country music legend Steve Earle inviting him to come to Nashville and record an album, to be released on Earle's short-lived record label E-squared. The album was produced by Earle and Ray Kennedy, and featured several renowned session musicians, such as Peter Rowan and Jerry Douglas.

Track listing
All tracks composed by Bap Kennedy; except where noted.
 "Long Time a Comin'" – 2:38
 "The Way I Love Her" – 3:30
 "Unforgiven" – 3:37
 "Domestic Blues" – 2:57
 "I've Fallen in Love" – 3:21
 "Vampire" – 2:36
 "Angel Is the Devil" (Steve Earle) – 2:50
 "The Backroom" – 3:20
 "Mostly Water" – 3:20
 "The Ghosts of Belfast" – 2:51
 "My Money" – 3:15
 "The Shankill and the Falls" – 2:46

UK Special Edition version
The album was re-released in a "special edition" form in the UK in 2000. The special edition had a different album cover, featuring a photograph of Kennedy's mother as a child, and contained two extra tracks, "Lowlife" and "Dream of You". The latter included Kennedy playing the Ewan MacColl song "Dirty Old Town" as a hidden track.

Personnel
Musicians
Bap Kennedy – acoustic guitar and vocals on all tracks
Roy Huskey, Jr. – upright bass on all tracks
Peter Rowan – mandolin on all tracks except 2, 4, 5 and 14 backing vocals on tracks 1, 2, 5, 7, 10 and 11, mandola on track 2, classical guitar on tracks 3, 5 and 14
Jerry Douglas – dobro on all tracks except 4, 10 and 13, lap steel on tracks 4, 10, 12 and 13
Steve Earle – acoustic guitar on all tracks except 3, 8 and 10, High-string guitar on track 2, archtop guitar, on track 2, 12-string guitar on tracks 3, 8 and 10, backing vocals on tracks 4 and 6
Larry Atamanuik – drums and percussion on all tracks except 4, 8, 9 and 12, Hammond organ on track 9
Michael Smotherman – Hammond B-3 organ on track 3, drums on track 8
Nancy Blake – cello on tracks 5 and 12, fiddle on track 7
Ray Kennedy – backing vocals on track 5
Nanci Griffith – backing vocals on tracks 2 10 and 12
Keith Weir – piano on tracks 6, 7 and 11
Dan Gillis – tin whistle on track 10
Paul Guerin – lead guitar on tracks 13 and 14

Production
Steve Earle – Music production and engineering
Ray Kennedy – production, engineering and recording
Patrick Earle – assistant engineering
Hank Williams – mastering
(Please note that this Hank Williams is of no relation to the singer-songwriter Hank Williams)
Alan Messer – Photography

References

1998 debut albums
Bap Kennedy albums
Albums produced by Steve Earle